Black Star Canyon is a remote mountain canyon in the Santa Ana Mountains, located in eastern Orange County, California. It is a watershed of the Santa Ana River. Black Star Canyon is a popular destination for mountain bikers as well as hikers due to its wild scenery. The California Historical Landmark associated with the canyon refers to the village of Puhú.

History

Tongva-Gabrieliño 
Black Star Canyon is perhaps best known to historians as an important archaeological site as much information concerning the daily lives of the Tongva-Gabrieliño people has been uncovered through studies of artifacts found in the canyon. It is known that many of the native Tongva people fled to the mountains in the summer, searching not only for relief from the heat, but also for acorns, their main source of food, which were easy to find among the canyon's many mature oak trees. It is very likely that the settlement – located in the upper part of the canyon – was inhabited for only part of the year. The site of the settlement is now California Historical Landmark number 217. Indian settlements were very sporadic, as the grizzly bear population of the Santa Anas was comparatively high for such a small mountain range.

The village of Puhú was a major residential area for the Tongva, Acjachemen, Payómkawichum, and Serrano in the area and the site of a massacre in 1831. According to a story recounted by early settler J. E. "Judge" Pleasants, a battle between American fur trappers, led by William Wolfskill, and a group of Tongva Indians occurred as follows:

This event has more recently been identified as a communal massacre. More recent in-depth research has revealed flaws in this memorialization of the villagers both in relation to the size of the village and the activities of the villagers. The claim that villagers were consuming horse flesh has been identified as a common trope promoted by Spanish colonial authorities, particularly in the Alta California region. Scientific analysis of the village's midden found that no horse or European livestock remains were present.

Spanish, Mexican, early American eras 
Under Spanish, and later Mexican rule, the canyon was called Cañada de los Indios. Much of grassy foothill terrain to the west (across Irvine Lake) was part of the expansive Mexican land grant of "Rancho Lomas de Santiago (Ranch of Saint James' Hills)".  The rancho later fell into the hands of the pioneer and horticulturalist William Wolfskill, and finally James Irvine, before becoming part of the Cleveland National Forest in the late 1880s.

After discovering coal deposits in the canyon, August Witte founded the Black Star Coal Mining Company in 1879, which gave the canyon its current name. The coal was originally dug from a shallow pit on the hill just east of the canyon mouth, used almost exclusively by the canyon's few residents. While the operation lasted, six to ten tons of medium- to low-grade coal were extracted each day from the mine's 900 feet of tunnel. From there, mule teams hauled the cargo to Anaheim or Los Angeles by wagon. However, a survey was run of the mine in the late 1870s, previously thought to be operating on government land, and it was found that the land actually belonged to the Irvine Ranch. Promptly losing interest in the mine, James Irvine sold the operation back to its former owners, destroying any possibility of profit.

The Black Star mining operation was later replaced by the Santa Clara Mine, a more successful enterprise that sustained the town of Carbondale (once existed at the mouth of Silverado canyon), before it was taken over by AT&SF Railroad.

The armed conflict in 1831 between trappers led by William Wolfskill and Native Americans has led to many urban legends stating the mine is haunted to this day.

The mine has operated on and off until it closed for good in the early 20th century.

Park
Traces of the Black Star mining operation can still be found, including rusted mining equipment, abandoned shafts, and piles of low-grade coal scattered about the floor of the canyon (similar to those found in Fremont Canyon to the north). In the early 1920s, the United States Forest Service built a narrow but well-graded road up Black Star Canyon and down the eastern slope of the mountains to Corona, thus opening the ranchlands of the upper canyon to hikers. Today, public access to the canyon's upper reaches in the Cleveland National Forest is currently allowed via a county easement through the lower section of the canyon, although Orange County officials do not maintain the road.

The lower part of the canyon, along both sides of Black Star Canyon Road from Santiago Canyon Road, is OC Parks property. The area is open for scheduled programs only, managed by Irvine Ranch Conservancy. This portion of the canyon is part of a National Natural Landmark, known as the Irvine Ranch Natural Landmarks. A listing of programs is available on the Landmarks' website.

The beginning of the canyon is marked with signs which declare the road as private, which is half-true since the lower part of the road is privately maintained, although the county and, therefore the forest service, have an easement of public right-of-passage on the road, and have had that right for many decades.

Stories and legends

Hidden Ranch murder 
The canyon would find itself the scene of a second murder. In 1899, long after the canyon had been settled by both Anglo-American and Mexican homesteaders, a shooting occurred at Hidden Ranch that would forever change Orange County's early political scene.

References

External links
The Nature Conservancy: Santa Ana Mountains
Santa Ana Mountains Wild Heritage Project
Cleveland National Forest website
Santa Ana Mountains Natural History Association
Irvine Ranch Open Space at OC Parks
Black Star Canyon Wilderness Park at Irvine Ranch Natural Landmarks
Naturalist For You
Trail Information, HikingGuy

California Historical Landmarks
Canyons and gorges of California
Cleveland National Forest
Santa Ana Mountains
Landforms of Orange County, California
National Natural Landmarks in California
Protected areas of Orange County, California
Santa Ana River